The 2003 Exeter City Council election took place on 1 May 2003, to elect members of Exeter City Council in Devon, England. The election was held concurrently with other local elections in England. One third of the council was up for election and the Labour Party lost control of the council, which it had held since 1995.

Results summary

Ward results

Alphington

Cowick

Duryard

Exwick

Heavitree

Mincinglake

Priory

St James

St Leonards

St Loyes

St Thomas

Topsham

Whipton & Barton

References

2003 English local elections
2003
2000s in Exeter